Michel Jetté is a Québécois director, screenwriter, producer and editor. He produced three full-length movies, several short films, and over a hundred television reports. His most recent upcoming release is BumRush on 1 April 2011.

He studied communication and cinema and interned under the filmmaker Jean Lefebvre between 1989 and 1984, during which time he released three short films: L'Ombre de la lumière (1979), Pixil, and Jan de Table (1984). He then produced L'univers d'Audrée (1986) and La Tarentule (1998).

Awards and nominations
Jetté won the Gemini Award for Best Current Affairs Series three times for his subsequent directing of the television series Le Match de la Vie between 1990 and 1994.
In 2000, he won "Grand Prix des Amériques" for Hochelaga at the Montreal World Film Festival
In 2001, he was nominated for three Jutra Awards for Hochelaga, namely for Best Direction, Best Editing and Best Screenplay.

Filmography
Movies
1994: Le lac de la lune
2000: Hochelaga 
2002: Inside (Histoire de pen)
2011: BumRush

Short films
1979: L'Ombre de la lumière
????:  Pixil
1984: Jan de Table 
1986: L'univers d'Audrée
1988 La Tarentule

References

External links

BumRush Official website

Living people
Film producers from Quebec
Canadian screenwriters in French
Film directors from Quebec
Canadian Screen Award winners
French Quebecers
Year of birth missing (living people)